Paper Boat is a brand of traditional Indian beverages and foods produced and marketed by Hector Beverages, which is headquartered in Bengaluru, India.

Paper Boat was launched by Hector Beverages in August 2013. The product consists of a range of traditional, Indian drinks such as Aam Panna, Jaljeera and Aam Ras. The drinks were initially offered in single serving, flexible pouches; the company has since then expanded to one liter Tetra Pak cartons as well.

The company aims to preserve traditional recipes while using innovation to make the Indian drinks accessible to an urban market. Paper Boat does not use artificial coloring or preservatives in its products.

The company is funded by N.R. Narayana Murthy-led Catamaran Ventures, Footprint Ventures and Sequoia Capital, among other investors.

History
Hector Beverages was founded in 2009 by Neeraj Kakkar, Neeraj Biyani, Suhas Misra and James Nuttall.

The company's first product was a protein drink called Frissia, following which the energy drink brand, Tzinga was launched in 2011.

In March 2013, the company launched Paper Boat, a fruit pulp based beverage brand and shifted its focus to the ethnic drinks segment. The Paper Boat brand aimed to bring back traditional drinks of India into the modern context.

The idea for the brand is said to have taken birth during one of the office lunch that the co-founders would have together in the early years. Mishra's mother would pack him a flask of Aam Panna everyday and once while reaching out for the drink, as they were mulling over business ideas, a brain wave to commercially produce ethnic Indian drinks that were hitherto unavailable in the market struck. And the idea for Paper Boat was born.

The brand launched with Aam Panna and Jal Jeera drinks and later added a wide range of ethnic drinks to its portfolio including Aam Ras, Chilled Rasam, Kokum, Jamun Kala Khatta, Chilli Gauva and Neer More.

The company went through a few organizational changes when co-founders Misra and Nuttall left the company in 2014, and 2015, respectively, leaving Kakkar and Biyani at the helm.

In 2016, in a bid to increase in house consumption of the brand, Paper Boat launched 500 ml Tetra Prisma Aseptic (TPA) packs of its two most popular drinks, Aam Ras and Anar. The 500 ml packs were discontinued in 2017, when the brand expanded its offering by launching its drinks in 1 liter Tetra Prisma Aseptic cartons. This move widened the brand's reach to the multi-serve category.

Paper Boat expanded to the traditional food segment in 2016 by launching the Indian snack, peanut chikki. and books Sticking to the core brand philosophy, Paper Boat foods aims to provide ethnic Indian snacks in contemporary, modern packaging. Paper Boat recently tied up with Accenture to increase its offerings of different authentic tastes in 2020.

Products 
Paper Boat offers a range of fruit based ethnic drinks such as Jal Jeera, Aam Panna, Aam Ras, Alphonso Aam, Jamun Kala Khatta, Chilli Guava, Nimbu Pani, Kokum, Neer More, Kanji, Sugarcane juice, Lychee Ras, Apple and Orange. It also has a range of milk based beverages including Neer More, Butter Milk, Badam Milk and Thandai. The brand also launched Coconut Water in 2018.

Apart from these, Paper Boat produces two seasonal drinks associated with Indian festivals, Panakam (available during Ram Navami) and Sherbet-e-Khas (available during Eid).

In its one-liter Tetra Pack cartons the brand delivers Aam Ras, Jamun, Anar, Apple, Guava, Mixed Fruit, Pineapple, Cranberry, Tomato and Lychee Ras.

The drinks are manufactured in ultra hygienic production facilities and do not contain preservatives or artificial coloring. Aam Ras, one of the brand's most popular drinks, contains 45% mango pulp and is made from naturally ripened mangoes.

Peanut chikki was Paper Boat's first venture into ethic Indian snacks. Paper Boat chikki is a Fair-Trade product, a certification that ensures that everyone involved in the making of a product is fairly employed and paid. The company procures its groundnuts directly from a farmers’ collective near Rajkot in Gujarat at the Fairtrade minimum price.

Paper Boat chikki has three other variants: crushed peanut, sesame and Rajgira peanut.

Production
Hector Beverages presently has two manufacturing facilities, one in Mysuru and one in Manesar, Gurgaon, and can produce up to ten million of the pouches per month.

The company's  first production plant was established in Manesar in 2010. However, with increase in demand, the Manesar plant couldn't keep up the production. The plant also did not have the facilities for the manufacture of coconut water and sugar cane juice, drinks that the company was looking to launch. This led them to set up a second, larger manufacturing unit in Mysuru, Karnataka in 2014. While the Manesar plant has a production capacity of 80 bottles per minute, in the Mysuru plant, it is 380 bottles per minute.

Marketing
As a brand based on age-old recipes and memories, Paper Boat's marketing strategy revolves around nostalgia, childhood and innocence. The brand name Paper Boat and the tag line, ‘Drinks and Memories’ is aimed at re-connecting the consumers to their childhood. Paper Boat's beverages such as Aam Panna and Jal Jeera are drinks that their consumers grew up drinking and carry a strong association with their childhood.

Paper Boat's television advertising campaign consisted of a series of simple, evocative ads that reflected the brand idea of childhood nostalgia. The ads were set to an adaptation of the music of RK Narayan’s iconic Malgudi Days. Paper Boat’s debut campaign was penned and narrated by renowned poet and lyricist Gulzar, while the later campaign was written by lyricist Swanand Kirkire.

Apart from its television ads, the brand has also released a range short films celebrating childhood memories and nostalgia. ‘Ride Down the River of Memories’, ‘Waiting for Ma’, ‘My Struggles with the Treasure Chest’ and ‘Hum honge kamyab’ – are all short films aimed at bringing out the child in everyone. In 2016, Paper Boat released 'Rizwan - Keeper of the Gates of Heaven,' a 3.30 minute film created by the creative agency, Humour Me. The film narrates the story of an old man named Rizwan who reminisces about his childhood and is a celebration of innocence, bravery and love. The video used animation, narration and strong characterization to tell a moving tale.

Paper Boat has a strong presence on social media with compelling digital marketing campaigns. It has over 353K following on Facebook and 122 k followers on Instagram. While its Facebook campaign showcases illustrations celebrating childhood memories, the brand's Instagram page uses doodles, visual stories and creative projects to tell the Paper Boat story.

As an extension of its marketing campaign, Paper Boat has also ventured into book publishing. It has published reprints of the classics, Three Men in a Boat and Jungle Book, which were given away with the beverages as part of gift boxes and sales offers. In 2017, the brand published Half Pants Full Pants by Anand Suspi, a collection of real-life tales about growing up in Shimoga.

References

Further reading

External links
 

Indian drink brands
Products introduced in 2013
Fruit drinks